KLMB (99.9 FM) is a radio station licensed to serve the community of Klein, Montana. The station is owned by Bill Edwards' Edwards Broadcasting, and airs a community radio format.

The station was assigned the call sign KTRO by the Federal Communications Commission on March 9, 2013. The station changed its call sign to KZMO on September 17, 2013, and to KLMB on April 29, 2017.

References

External links
 Official Website
 FCC Public Inspection File for KLMB
 

LMB (FM)
Radio stations established in 2014
2014 establishments in Montana
Community radio stations in the United States
Musselshell County, Montana